Großer Peetscher See is a lake in the Rostock district in Mecklenburg-Vorpommern, Germany. At an elevation of 2.1 m, its surface area is 0.62 km².

External links

Lakes of Mecklenburg-Western Pomerania